Close to the Edge is the fifth studio album by English progressive rock band Yes. It was released on 13 September 1972 by Atlantic Records, and is their last album of the 1970s to feature their original drummer Bill Bruford. After scoring a commercial and critical hit with Fragile and touring the album, Yes regrouped to prepare material for a follow-up, ideas for which had been put down some months before. The album's centrepiece is the 18-minute title track, with themes and lyrics inspired by the Herman Hesse novel Siddhartha. Side two contains two non-conceptual tracks, the folk-inspired "And You and I" and the comparatively straightforward rocker "Siberian Khatru". Bruford found the album particularly laborious to make, which culminated in his decision to quit the band after it was recorded, to join King Crimson.

Close to the Edge became the band's greatest commercial success at the time of release. It peaked at No. 4 on the UK Albums Chart and No. 3 on the Billboard 200 in the United States, the highest position Yes has reached on the latter chart. A two-part edit of "And You and I" was released in the US which reached No. 42 on the Billboard Hot 100. Yes supported the album with their 1972–1973 world tour which comprised over 90 dates and marked the debut of drummer Alan White, who replaced Bruford three days before the tour started. Close to the Edge was certified platinum by the Recording Industry Association of America in 1998 for selling one million copies. It was reissued in 1994, 2003, and 2013; the latter includes previously unreleased tracks and new stereo and 5.1 surround sound mixes by Steven Wilson. 

In 2020, Close to the Edge was ranked at #445 on Rolling Stones list of the 500 Greatest Albums of All Time.

Background 
By 1972, Yes had settled with a line-up of lead vocalist Jon Anderson, bassist Chris Squire, drummer Bill Bruford, guitarist Steve Howe, and keyboardist Rick Wakeman. In March 1972, they wrapped their six-month Fragile Tour of the UK and North America to support their fourth album, Fragile (1971). The album became their biggest commercial and critical hit since their formation, helped by the track "Roundabout" receiving considerable airplay on American radio. On 1 and 2 February 1972, during one of the tour's rest periods, the band booked time at Advision Studios in London to put down some tracks for a follow-up record. When touring finished, they took another break before they entered rehearsals at the Una Billings School of Dance in Shepherd's Bush in May 1972. Although some arrangements were worked out and put onto tape during this time, none of the tracks were fully written at this stage, leaving the group to devise the rest of the songs in the studio and learn to play them through afterwards. On several occasions the arrangements that Yes had started to assemble were so complex that they were forgotten by the time the next day's session began. This caused the band to record each rehearsal for future reference. Bruford devised the album's title to reflect the state of the band at the time.

Recording 
By June 1972, Yes had worked out songs for the album and returned to Advision to record it. Eddy Offord, who had worked with Yes since Time and a Word (1970) and had mixed their live sound on the Fragile tour, assumed his role as audio engineer and producer, sharing his production duties with the band. Having worked on the band's live sound, Offord wished to recreate, in the studio, the high feeling the band had on nights when they performed well in concert. To attempt this, he got their road crew to construct a large stage in the studio for the band to perform on; he noted that Bruford's drums resonated with the wooden platform and made the band sound "more live". The studio also housed a booth-like structure constructed of wooden boards which Howe performed in to enhance his sound further. In one incident, the band decided to use a particular take for a track, but realised that the studio's cleaning staff had put the tape in the rubbish. A scramble in the bins outside the studio ensued, and the missing piece was found and inserted into the master. Around halfway through recording, Anderson decided to walk home from the studio after one exhausting session ended at dawn. He broke down in tears upon arriving, because he decided that he could "officially call myself a musician now", and wrote it on the occupation section of his passport which he had previously left blank until that point.

During their month at Advision, Melody Maker reporter and band biographer Chris Welch paid a visit to observe the group at work. Welch described a stressful atmosphere, coupled with "outbursts of anarchy" from Bruford, Howe, and Wakeman and disagreement from each member after one mix of a song section was complete. Welch sensed that the band were not a cohesive unit, with Anderson and Howe the only ones who knew what direction the album was to take, leaving the rest adding bits and pieces "to a vast jigsaw of sound", to which Squire and Offord were the two who helped put their idea into shape. Wakeman and Bruford, to Welch, remained "innocent bystanders" in the matter. In one instance, Welch arrived at the studio to hear a preview of a completed passage that took several days of round-the-clock work to produce. He heard a dull thud, to find that Offord had fallen asleep on top of the mixing console from exhaustion, "leaving music from the spinning tape deck blaring at an intolerable level". Howe later disagreed with Welch's description, and said his report might have been based on Bruford's comments at the time. Howe said that the main source of tension was between Squire and Bruford, particularly when Squire suggested that Bruford alter his drumming to accommodate bass parts that Squire wanted to play.

Bruford found Close to the Edge particularly difficult to write and record with the rest of the band, calling the process torturous and like "climbing Mount Everest". He became frustrated with the band's happy, diatonic music and favoured more jazz-oriented and improvisational compositions. This became an issue with the group's way of composing and recording, as each section of a track was played through and discussed section by section. Bruford said: "Every instrument was up for democratic election, and everybody had to run an election campaign on every issue. It was horrible, it was incredibly unpleasant, and unbelievably hard work". Squire became a growing source of discontent for Bruford, citing his frequent lateness for rehearsals and his way of working. In one instance, Bruford fell asleep on a sofa in the studio control room while Squire was "poring over a couple of knobs on the [mixing] desk" to determine how much equalisation should be applied to his bass tracks, only to wake up several hours later, finding Squire "in the same place, still considering the relative position of the two knobs". Bruford was constantly encouraged by Anderson to write, something he felt grateful for years later, but by the time recording was complete, he felt he had done his best on Close to the Edge and could not offer better arrangements. "So then I knew I needed a breath of fresh air", and left the group.

Songs

Side one 
"Close to the Edge" was written by Anderson and Howe, both of whom also share lyrical credits. Its 18-minute length marked the longest track Yes had recorded at the time. Anderson gained initial inspiration from a moment in his hotel room during the Fragile Tour when he was reading The Lord of the Rings by J. R. R. Tolkien while listening to Symphony Nos. 6 and 7 by Jean Sibelius, one of his favourite composers. The seventh struck Anderson the most as he noticed that its main theme was introduced some time in the composition which influenced how "Close to the Edge" was shaped. He studied No. 7 for the remainder of the tour; roughly halfway, he discussed his initial ideas with Howe. During a break the two resumed writing at Howe's home in Hampstead, north London, at which point Howe devised the lyric "Close to the edge, round by the corner", itself inspired when he had lived in Battersea, an area beside the River Thames. Anderson was inspired to base its theme and lyrics on Siddhartha (1922) by German novelist Hermann Hesse, and revised the song's lyrics "three or four" times, saying "it's all metaphors". The lyrics for the concluding verse were based on a dream he once had about the "passing on from this world to another... yet feeling so fantastic about it that death never frightened me ever since".

The song's tape loop introduction, a combination of keyboard and nature sounds, including flowing water and bird chirps recorded on location, measured approximately 40 feet in length and took two days to record. Anderson was inspired to include the bird sounds, and the instrumental section in "I Get Up, I Get Down", from hearing Sonic Seasonings (1972), an electronic ambient album by Wendy Carlos. Anderson suggested starting with an improvised group jam, which the group saw as adventurous and is one of the reasons why the band comes in out of nowhere on the final take. The track was assembled in pieces throughout, as Bruford described, "in ten, twelve, sixteen-bar sections". Its introduction came about after the band had toured with fusion group Mahavishnu Orchestra; someone in the band suggested having the piece open with improvisation with pre-arranged pauses.

The music played during the "Close to the edge, round by the corner" section was originally a same-titled song that Howe had put together several years prior, in part based on the longest day of the year. Anderson and Howe agreed this section fit best with an Anderson composition titled "Total Mass Retain", thus joining the two ideas together. Howe had prepared another song, of which its middle eight was adapted into the "In her white lace" section of "I Get Up, I Get Down". Wakeman's organ solo was written by Howe for the guitar originally, but he thought the arrangement sounded better on the organ. It is played on the pipe organ at St Giles-without-Cripplegate church in Barbican, London. The band produced a take of the section after the church organ solo that they were satisfied with, but when it came to inserting it into the final mix, Offord had inserted the take he thought was the right one and placed the good take in the bin of scrapped tape. The result caused a noticeable tape edit that had to stay in the mix as the task of reproducing the sound exactly would have been a near impossibility. Anderson sings the final verses in G minor, which had to be scaled down to F on stage due to the strain on his voice.

Side two 
"And You and I" originated as a more folk-oriented song that Anderson developed which was based around the idea of presenting a theme and building it as the track progresses. The track is in four sections; its style and themes were worked on by Howe, Bruford, and Squire, the only track on the album that credits Bruford and Squire as writers. Anderson pitched his ideas for the track while strumming chords on a guitar, singing the section where the first lyric comes in. It was a theme that Howe particularly enjoyed and was keen to develop. While introducing the song on tour, Anderson said its working title was "The Protest Song". In its original form, the song had an extended ending that Welch described as "a shattering climax", but its popularity amongst the band decreased over time, leading to their decision to cut it from the final version. In a newspaper review of a Yes show in August 1972, the writer paraphrased that Anderson calls the song "a tale of the search for truth and purity between two people". Anderson himself said it is similar to that of a hymn, in the sense of feeling "secure in the knowledge of knowing there is somebody... God maybe". The track starts with Howe on a Guild 12-string acoustic that belonged to Squire, initially playing improvised harmonics and saying "Okay" in response to Offord who signalled to Howe that he was ready to record. The moment was not part of the song, but Offord liked it and persuaded the band to keep it in. "The Preacher, the Teacher" was developed in a single afternoon. Anderson suggested the idea of it having a more country feel, to which Howe and Squire came up with respective guitar and bass arrangements that Anderson thought "sat together so sweet".

"Siberian Khatru" is a more straightforward rock song that developed from an idea that Anderson had on an acoustic guitar. He did not have the entire track worked out, so the rest of the group took the sections he needed help with and discussed what riffs best suited it as it lacked one strong enough to carry the song. Wakeman received a writing credit on the song, and has a solo played on a Thomas Goff model harpsichord. He recalled Goff visiting the studio and directing Offord on the best way to setup and record the instrument. In terms of its lyrics, Anderson noted the song is a collection of "interesting words, though it does relate to the dreams of clear summer days". He claimed "khatru" translates to "as you wish" in the Yemeni dialect of Arabic, but had no idea what the word meant at the time until he asked someone to look up its meaning. Howe said the group were inspired by Igor Stravinsky when it came to the end of the song, "by having that staccato pounding and at the same time throwing those accents on voice and drums and having me driving through it with that constant guitar motif." When it came to recording Howe's ending guitar solo, one experiment involved Offord placing one microphone by the amplifier and having his assistant swing a second microphone around the room to create a Doppler effect. John Frusciante of Red Hot Chili Peppers has cited the closing solo as an influence for his own guitar solo on "Get on Top". He said: "The band sound is really big — and they're playing fast — and then this clean guitar comes out over the top. It's really beautiful, like it's on its own sort of shelf. For 'Get on Top', I wanted to play something that would create a contrast between the solo and the background."

Artwork 

Close to the Edge was packaged with a gatefold sleeve designed and illustrated by Roger Dean, who had also designed the cover for Fragile (1971). It marked the first appearance of the band's iconic logotype, placed on top a simple front cover design of a linear colour gradient from black to green. Dean came up with the logo without the band's knowledge and before they had started work on Close to the Edge. He sketched it out during a train journey from London to Brighton with the idea that the three letters could be put together "in an interesting way". Upon Dean's arrival in Brighton, he had finished it. Dean pitched the idea of having the title lettering silver-blocked like a traditional book but it never materialised. Dean's logo has been described as a "calligraphed colophon".

In his original design, Dean wanted the album to resemble the quality of a gold embossed book and have a leather texture as he had owned many leather-bound sketchbooks. Dean gained inspiration for the artwork during a visit to Haystacks, a tall hill in the Lake District. He took a photograph at its summit and observing the many tarns surrounding it. "I was imagining this lake as something grander [...] How could it sustain itself on the tippy top of a mountain?" The sleeve includes pictures of the group and Offord that were photographed by Dean and Martyn Adelman, who had played with Squire in the late 1960s as a member of The Syn. Dean wrote the sleeve's text and lyric sheet by hand. On reflection on the album's design, Dean said: "There were a couple of ideas that merged there. It was of a waterfall constantly refreshing itself, pouring from all sides of the lake, but where was the water coming from? I was looking for an image to portray that".

Release 
Close to the Edge was released on 13 September 1972, three months into the band's 1972–73 world tour to promote the album. It became their biggest commercial success since their formation, reaching number 3 on the Billboard 200 chart in the United States and number 4 on the UK Albums Chart. In the Netherlands, the album went to number one. The album received 450,000 advanced orders in the United States. On 30 October 1972, the album was certified gold by the Recording Industry Association of America (RIAA) for 500,000 copies sold in the United States. Atlantic Records owner Ahmet Ertegun presented the group with their gold disc award at a restaurant in New York City on 20 November, where their manager, Brian Lane, announced the band's new five-year contract with Atlantic. The album continued to sell, and was certified platinum for one million copies sold on 10 April 1998.

Yes released "And You and I" as a two-part single in the United States in October 1972. In the United Kingdom, the song was released in its entirety with "Roundabout" on its B-side. It peaked at number 42 on the Billboard Hot 100 singles chart in the United States for the week of 16 December 1972. A single edit of "Total Mass Retain" was released as the B-side to the group's non-album single, a rendition of "America" made famous by Simon & Garfunkel, released on 17 July 1972.

Reception and legacy 

Close to the Edge received favourable reviews among critics at the time of release in magazines and newspapers. New Musical Express printed a more mixed review from Ian MacDonald on 2 September 1972. He thought the group were "not just close to the edge, they've gone right over it", though they "played their God-damned guts out" on the album which he called "an attempt to overwhelm us which resulted in only unmemorable meaninglessness". MacDonald concluded: "On every level but the ordinary aesthetic one, it's one of the most remarkable records pop has yet produced". American music magazine Cashbox hailed the album as "a recording masterpiece". In a positive review, Billboard selected the album in its weekly "Billboard Pick" feature, noting that Yes had "progressed to the point where they are light years beyond their emulators, proving to be no mere flash in the pan. The sound tapestries they weave are dainty fragments, glimpses of destinies yet to be formed, times that fade like dew drops in the blurriness of desires half-remembered. All involved deserve praise and thanks, this being not a mere audio experience, transcending the medium it brings all senses into play."

Henry Medoza opened his review for The San Bernardino Sun with: "Not since ... Sgt. Pepper's Lonely Hearts Club Band has there been one side on an album that expressed such a complete and exciting a musical thought as side one", and thought it presented the group with a new level of sophistication. He praised the group's vocal harmonies and Bruford's "deep irregular bass drum" on the opening of the title track, but picked its third section as the most interesting with the trading vocals, Wakeman's "dream-like" and "powerful" organ playing. Mendoza described side two as more "uninspiring" than the first, but praised the vocals and harmonies on both tracks, noting they sound like its own instrument on "Siberian Khatru". The Lubbock Avalanche-Journal printed another positive review by Jon Clemens. He called the title track a "virtual sound trip", moving "quickly, loudly, in a frenzy" that "contrasts brilliantly" during "I Get Up, I Get Down", and praises the vocals during the section. Clemens thought highly of Howe and Wakeman's interplay throughout, but thought the group's tendency to change tempo frequently risks distracting the listener. For the San Mateo Times, Peter J. Barsocchini thought the album is "good in concept and performance", with the title track "quite likely the best piece of music" the band had recorded in its career. "And You and I", Barsocchini thought, is "an interesting meshing of acoustic and electronic music" that is "tightly, integrally produced". To him, "Siberian Khatru" was comparable to their Fragile album that does not further the group's sound like the album's other two cuts do.

The album has continued to receive many positive retrospective reviews. In his review for AllMusic, Dave Thompson gave the album five stars out of five, hailing it as a "flawless masterpiece". Paul Stump's 1997 History of Progressive Rock asserted that Close to the Edge, with its equal measures of ambition and heartfelt playing, "even today draws grudging respect from Yes's most trenchant critics." In a special edition of Q and Mojo magazines published in 2005, Close to the Edge came in at number 3 in its 40 Cosmic Rock Albums list. The record is also listed in the musical reference publication 1001 Albums You Must Hear Before You Die by Robert Dimery. In a reader's choice of the 100 Greatest Guitar Albums of All Time for Guitar World, the album came in at number 67. Sound & Vision ranked it number 32 on its Top 50 Albums of All Time list. The album came in at number 5 on Rolling Stones list of the top 50 greatest progressive rock albums of all time. It was voted number 130 in Colin Larkin's All Time Top 1000 Albums. The album came in at number 1 on a list of the 100 greatest progressive rock albums of all time by Prog magazine. It also made Rolling Stones list of the top 500 greatest albums of all time at number 445.

 Reissues 
In 1987, Close to the Edge was reissued by Atlantic Records on CD in the United States  and Europe. Another issue of the album was digitally remastered by Joe Gastwirt in 1994. In 2003, the album was reissued again on disc in an expanded and remastered edition by Rhino and Elektra Records. Included were two previously unreleased tracks: an alternate version of "And You and I", an early run-through of "Siberian Khatru", and Yes's 1972 single "America" with its b-side, an edit of "Total Mass Retain".

In 2013, two new editions of the album were released. Steve Hoffman of Audio Fidelity Records conducted a remastering in both CD and Super Audio CD formats. For the Panegyric label, Steven Wilson used the original multi-track recordings to produce a "2013 stereo mix", a 5.1 surround sound mix, and an "original stereo mix" from a flat transfer of the LP, in both a CD and DVD-Audio and CD and Blu-ray Disc package. Bonus tracks include single edits, an early rough mix of "Close to the Edge", and instrumental versions of the album's three tracks.

 Bruford's departure and tour 
On 19 July 1972, once recording for the album was complete, Bruford left the band to join King Crimson. He offered to tour with the band for the remainder of the year, yet Howe wanted him to leave sooner as he no longer had the commitment. Howe later regretted his decision as he would have enjoyed playing the album live with Bruford at the time. His replacement was Alan White of the Plastic Ono Band and Terry Reid's group. As he played on Close to the Edge but left before the subsequent tour, Bruford was obliged by management to share his album royalties with White and claims that Lane enforced a compensation payment of $10,000 from him for leaving. Years later, White agreed to return his share of the royalties upon Bruford's request. The band embarked on their largest yet world tour to promote the album. White had one full rehearsal with the band prior to the tour's start on 30 July 1972, which saw the band play a total of 95 concerts in the United States, Canada, United Kingdom, Japan, and Australia. The tour ended in April 1973. Recordings from the tour, both film and audio, were released on the band's first live album, Yessongs (1973), and concert film of the same name, filmed at the Rainbow Theatre in London and released in 1975.

 Track listing 
Details are taken from the 1972 UK Atlantic album liner notes; other releases may show different information.

 Personnel YesJon Anderson – lead vocals
Steve Howe – guitars, Coral electric sitar, steel guitar, backing vocals
Chris Squire – bass, backing vocals
Rick Wakeman – accoustic and electric pianos, Hammond organ, Minimoog synthesizer, Mellotron, harpsichord
Bill Bruford – drums, percussionProductionYes – production
Eddy Offord – engineer, production
Mike Dunne – tapes
Roger Dean – cover, photography
Martin Adelman – photography
Brian Lane – co-ordinator

Charts

 Certifications 

 Notes 

 References Bibliography'

External links 
Official album website at YesWorld

Yes (band) albums
Albums with cover art by Roger Dean (artist)
1972 albums
Albums produced by Eddy Offord
Atlantic Records albums